Olena Buzhenko (born 16 November 1972) is a Ukrainian middle-distance runner. She competed in the women's 800 metres at the 2000 Summer Olympics.

References

1972 births
Living people
Athletes (track and field) at the 2000 Summer Olympics
Ukrainian female middle-distance runners
Olympic athletes of Ukraine
Place of birth missing (living people)
Universiade medalists in athletics (track and field)
Universiade silver medalists for Ukraine